Flutura Ibrahimi better known as Uta Ibrahimi (born 27 November 1983, Gjilan) is an Albanian alpinist from Kosovo.

She is the first Albanian woman to climb Mount Everest, the highest peak in the world.

After Mount Everest (22 May 2017), she has climbed Manasulu (8,163m), Cho-Oyu (8201m), Lhotse (8516m), Gasherburum (8080m), Annapurna 1 (8091m)  and  Makalu (8485m), thus making her officially the first woman from the Balkans to summit 7X8000 meters peaks.

Following her success, Uta Ibrahimi has been featured by many local and international media.

Through her alpinism activities, and media appearances, Uta seeks to raise awareness about nature, the mountains, and human rights particularly in Kosovo and Albania.

Uta is also a Sustainable Development Goals Champion, promoting gender equality, youth empowerment and environmental preservation.

Biography
Uta Ibrahimi was born in the city of Gjilan, Republic of Kosovo.  She graduated from the Faculty of Economics, at the University of Prishtina, where she studied Marketing.

She began her career as a marketing assistant at Iliria University, to continue her work as an expert in marketing in various private companies. Uta has worked as the Director of Ogilvy Karrota marketing agency. Besides her work in marketing, developing marketing campaigns for major business clients, she also worked on human rights-based social projects. Uta has also worked a marketing manager, jury member, and event organizer for DokuFest, a documentary film festival. In 2015 she left her career in marketing, to dedicate her energy to her passion for climbing.

In 2016, she founded Butterfly Outdoor Adventures Company, with the aim to promote culture and tourism in Kosova. Butterfly Outdoor Adventures was part of the project ‘Via Dinarica’ a USAID founded project that stabilized a mega trail from Kosovo to Slovenia and vice versa, and it is an ongoing platform that promotes and develops responsible tourism across the Western Balkans.

In 2019, Uta establishes the "Utalaya Foundation", whose mission is to raise a new generation of young mountaineers, who will love and protect the mountains. The Foundation's core activities are focused on sports, mountaineering, and raising awareness on protecting the environment, especially targeting young girls from disadvantaged rural communities. It has partnered up with many local and international organizations, and continues to expand its project portfolio every year.

Climbing career

Summits
 Musala  2,925m (Bulgaria),
 Mount Olympus 2,918m (Greece), 
 Erciyes 3,916m (Turkey), winter expedition,
 Mount Hasan 3,200m (Turkey), winter expedition,
 Emler 3,500m (Turkey), winter expedition,
 Mont Blanc 4,880m (France), winter expedition,
 Mount Rainier 4,392m Cautz Route (USA), 
 Yalung Peak 5,700m - winter expedition,
 Nurbu Peak 5,800m, New Route - winter expedition, 
 Ramdung Peak 5,925m- winter expedition,
 Labuche East 6,119 (climbed 3 times), 
 Island 6,189m, 
 Ama Dablam 6,812m 
 Triglav 2,553m, winter expedition.
 Mönch Peak 4,107 / winter expedition 

During this period of time, the idea of climbing fourteen highest peaks in the world was born.

Eight-thousander Expedition
‘Utalaya-14 highest peaks in the World’ began upon her arrival from the Everest, in 2017.

She has climbed:
 Everest (8,848m),
 Manasulu (8,163m),
 Cho-Oyu (8,201m),
 Lhotse (8,516m),
 Gasherburum (8,080m).
 Annapurna 1 (8091m) 
 Makalu (8485m) 

thus officially making her the first woman from the Balkans to summit 7X8000 meters peaks.

She was also part of the ‘National Geographic Team’ to summit Lhotse South Face in 2019 – reaching 7.800m.

Mountains Climbed

Popular Recognition

Sustainable Development Goals (SDG) Champion

In 2018 Uta was formally announced an SDG Champion and an influencer, involved with the United Nations Kosovo Team, promoting Environmental and Gender Equality and Youth Empowerment. She has been involved in the implementation and the development of projects that promote SDG3 - Gender Equality and SDG5 - Climate Action.

In addition to this, she is the first and the only Athlete in Kosovo that organizes hiking trips and outdoor adventures with children with Autism. As an influencer, she has been part of public campaigns, and talks, such as TedEx Albania; Bar Camp Prishtina; a Jury Member for Green Documentaries at DokuFest KS; World Clean Up Day Campaign Face of the Campaign - which in fact is one of the most recognized campaigns in the World - and Kosova has joined them only recently and is now a leader Country.

References

External links

Uta Ibrahimi in butterflyoutdoor.com

Summiters of Mount Everest
Kosovan mountain climbers
People from Gjilan
1983 births
Living people